Claydon Peak is a peak in the Queen Elizabeth Range,  high, which presents a rocky face to the northeast, standing just south of January Col. It was visited by the New Zealand Southern Survey Party of the Commonwealth Trans-Antarctic Expedition (1956–58) in early 1958, and named by them for Squadron-Leader John Claydon, commanding officer of the Antarctic Flight of the Royal New Zealand Air Force, who assisted the survey team operating in this vicinity.

References
 

Mountains of the Ross Dependency
Shackleton Coast